Nguyễn Đình Thi (December 20, 1924 – April 18, 2003) was a famous Vietnamese writer, poet and composer.

Biography
He was born on December 20, 1924, in Luang Prabang, Laos. His home, Vũ Thạch Village, is now known as Bà Triệu street, Tràng Tiền ward, Hoàn Kiếm District, Hanoi, Vietnam. His father was an official in the Indochina Post Office, who moved to Laos to work.

He came back to Vietnam in 1931, to study in Haiphong City and joined the Youth Rescue nation in 1941. He belonged to the generation of artists who were involved in the French defeat in the 1950s. He wrote essays on philosophy, poetry, music and drama.

After the August Revolution (1945), Nguyễn Đình Thi became the general secretary of the national culture association. From 1958 to 1989 he was secretary of the Vietnamese Writers association. From 1995, he was chairman of the Vietnam Union of Literature and Art Association. In 1996, he received the Ho Chi Minh Prize for literature. He died on April 18, 2003, in Hanoi.

Works

Philosophy
 Triết học nhập môn ("Introduction to philosophy") 1942
 Triết học Căng ("Kant's philosophy") 1942
 Triết học Nitsơ ("Nietzsche's philosophy") 1942
 Triết học Anhxtanh ("Einstein's philosophy") 1942

Musical compositions
 Diệt phát xít ("Annihilate Fascist"), was composed in 1945, first performed in the  meeting - the starting event of August Revolution in Hanoi - other two songs performed in the meeting were Tiến quân ca of Văn Cao and Du kích ca of Đỗ Nhuận. Diệt phát xít was chosen as the official daily theme tune of the Voice of Vietnam.
 Người Hà Nội ("People of Hanoi"), was composed and first performed in 1947, completed in 1948, a typical song of Nhạc đỏ, associated with singer Lê Dung's career. Người Hà Nội is the official daily theme tune of the Hanoi Radio Television since its first formed day.

Novels
 Xung kích ("Vanguard")          1951
 Bên bờ sông Lô ("On the Lô river bank") 1957
 Vào lửa ("Come in fire") 1966
 Mặt trận trên cao ("Aerial battle") 1967
 Vỡ bờ ("Broken Edge") section 1 - 1962, section  2 - 1970

Essays
 Mấy vấn đề văn học ("Some matters of literature") 1956
 Công việc của người viết tiểu thuyết ("Work of novel writer")  1964

Poems
 Đất nước ("Country") 1948-1955
 Người chiến sĩ ("The soldier", poetry collection) 1956
 Bài thơ Hắc Hải ("Black Sea Poem") 1958
 Dòng sông trong xanh ("Pure Blue River") 1974
 Tia nắng ("Sunbeam") 1983

Plays
 Con nai đen ("Black Deer") 1961
 Hoa và Ngần ("Hoa and Ngần") 1975
 Nguyễn Trãi ở Đông Quan ("Nguyễn Trãi in Eastern Gate") 1979
 Rừng trúc ("Bamboo Forest") 1979
 Người đàn bà hóa đá ("Petrified woman") 1980
 Giấc mơ ("Dream") 1983
 Tiếng sóng ("The sound of waves") 1985

Memory
A street along the southern bank of the West Lake (Hanoi) was named after Nguyễn Đình Thi since 2015.

In 2020, writer Nguyễn Đình Chính - a son of writer Nguyễn Đình Thi - established the Nguyễn Đình Thi Prize for Art and Literature, covering many fields that Nguyễn Đình Thi has devoted himself to, including literature, music, theater, fine arts, and art criticism, mainly for authors who have made many contributions to the country and rising young talents.

References

1924 births
2003 deaths
People from Hanoi
Vietnamese writers
Vietnamese composers
Vietnamese songwriters